Kellin Lee Deglan (born May 3, 1992) is a Canadian professional baseball catcher who is currently a free agent. He was drafted out of R.E. Mountain Secondary School in the 2010 Major League Baseball draft by the Texas Rangers.

Career

Texas Rangers
Despite not being able to play high school baseball, Deglan gained enough attention playing with the Langley Blaze of the wood-bat British Columbia Premier Baseball League (which had produced Justin Morneau and Brett Lawrie) and with the Canadian Junior National Team to be drafted 22nd overall by the Texas Rangers in the 2010 MLB draft. He signed for a below-slot bonus of $1 million. Baseball America viewed Deglan as a second or third round talent, praising his defense and power potential but seeing concerns about his overall offensive profile.

Deglan began his professional career in 2010 as an 18-year-old with the Arizona League Rangers in the rookie class Arizona League. He also appeared for the Low-A Spokane Indians, and hit .191 between the two teams. In 2011, he played for the Single-A Hickory Crawdads, slashing .227/.320/.347 in 89 games. He played 92 games for Hickory in 2012, batting .234/.310/.438 with career-highs in home runs (12) and RBI (41). He spent 2013 in High-A with the Myrtle Beach Pelicans, batting .231/.331/.393 in 89 games. The next year, he split the season between Hickory and Myrtle Beach, accumulating a .247/.314/.450 batting line with career-highs in home runs (16) and RBI (68). In 2015, he split the season between the High-A High Desert Mavericks and the Double-A Frisco RoughRiders, posting a batting line of .231/.284/.397 with 13 home runs and 42 RBI. Deglan spent the 2016 season with Frisco, hitting .194/.256/.332 in 83 games. He elected free agency on November 7, 2016.

New York Yankees
On December 12, 2016, Deglan signed a minor league contract with the New York Yankees organization, however, he missed the entire 2017 season due to injury and became a free agent after the year. On March 24, 2018, Deglan re-signed with the Yankees on a new minor league contract. He split the season between the High-A Tampa Tarpons and the Double-A Trenton Thunder, batting .179/.258/.286 in 36 games. The Yankees invited Deglan to spring training as a non-roster player in 2019. He did not make the team and split the 2019 season between Trenton and the Triple-A Scranton/Wilkes-Barre RailRiders, posting a .257/.329/.426 batting line with 9 home runs and 32 RBI. He became a free agent following the 2019 season. He re-signed with the Yankees on a new minor league deal and received an invitation to Spring Training on February 3, 2020. Deglan did not play in a game in 2020 due to the cancellation of the minor league season because of the COVID-19 pandemic. On November 2, 2020, Deglan elected free agency. On December 14, 2020, Deglan again re-signed with the Yankees on a minor league contract.

Toronto Blue Jays
On August 3, 2021, Deglan was traded to the Toronto Blue Jays. He signed a minor league contract for the 2022 season with the Blue Jays on November 29, and was invited to spring training. He was released on August 5, 2022.

International career
He was selected for the Canadian national baseball team at the 2013 World Baseball Classic Qualification, 2015 Pan American Games, 2015 WBSC Premier12, 2019 Pan American Games Qualifier and 2019 WBSC Premier12.

At the 2013 World Baseball Classic Qualification tournament, appearing in the September 22 game against Germany as a defensive replacement.

In 2015, Deglan was part of the Canadian Baseball team than won gold in the 2015 Pan American Games while playing in Ajax.

References

External links

1992 births
Living people
Arizona League Rangers players
Baseball catchers
Baseball people from British Columbia
Baseball players at the 2015 Pan American Games
Buffalo Bisons (minor league) players
Canada national baseball team players
Canadian expatriate baseball players in the United States
Charleston RiverDogs players
Frisco RoughRiders players
Hickory Crawdads players
High Desert Mavericks players
Melbourne Aces players
Myrtle Beach Pelicans players
Pan American Games gold medalists for Canada
Pan American Games medalists in baseball
People from Langley, British Columbia (city)
Scranton/Wilkes-Barre RailRiders players
Spokane Indians players
Surprise Saguaros players
Tampa Tarpons players
Trenton Thunder players
2015 WBSC Premier12 players
2019 WBSC Premier12 players
2023 World Baseball Classic players
Medalists at the 2015 Pan American Games
Canadian expatriate baseball players in Australia